The Swiss Democrats are a nationalist political party in Switzerland. It was called the National Action against the Alienation of the People and the Home (NA) until 1977 and the National Action for People and Home until 1990, when it was renamed to its current name.

History
The Nationale Aktion was originally a far-right xenophobic movement pursuing an anti-immigration agenda, founded in 1961. The party "emerged as a reaction to the influx of foreign workers," particularly Italians, during this time. The party submitted several popular initiatives that supported reduced immigration, most notably one in June 1970 that narrowly failed. Its first representative in the National Council was James Schwarzenbach, who was first elected in 1967.

After a hostile split with Schwarzenbach in 1971, who formed the Republican Movement, the party lost most of its momentum during the 1970s. It had a strong resurgence in the early 1980s, and it won 5 seats in the 1991 federal elections, the most it had ever held.

After another hostile split with former president Valentin Oehen in 1986, the party was renamed to its current name in 1990. After 1998, the party lost nearly all significance in national politics because of the absorption of right-wing votes into the growing Swiss People's Party.

In the 2003 federal elections, the party won 1.0% of the vote and 1 out of 200 seats in the National Council. This seat was lost in the 2007 elections, where the SD fell to 0.5% of the popular vote. After their severe election loss, the party congress decided not to disband but to continue competing in elections, striving to return to parliament.

Federal elections

Party presidents
Source:

James Schwarzenbach (?–1971)
Rudolf Weber (1971/72)
Valentin Oehen (1972–1980)
Hans Zwicky (1980–1986)
Rudolf Keller (1986–2005)
Bernhard Hess (2005–2012)
Andreas Stahel (2012–)

See also
Freedom Party of Switzerland.

References

Bibliography

External links
 Official web site

Political parties in Switzerland
Conservative parties in Switzerland
Eurosceptic parties in Switzerland
National conservative parties
Right-wing parties in Switzerland